"Bye Bye Bye" is a song by American boy band NSYNC from their third studio album, No Strings Attached. It was released on January 17, 2000, as the lead single from the album. The song was written and produced by Kristian Lundin and Jake Schulze, with additional writing by Andreas Carlsson. Its lyrics describe the end of a romantic relationship; it was reported to also reference the group's separation from their manager Lou Pearlman and their record label RCA Records.

"Bye Bye Bye" was a commercial success, peaking at number 4 on the US Billboard Hot 100 and within the top 10 in almost every country in which it charted. The song received a Grammy nomination in 2001 for Record of the Year, but lost to U2's "Beautiful Day".

Background and development
"Bye Bye Bye" was written and produced by Kristian Lundin and Jake Schulze, as part of Cheiron Productions, with additional writing by Andreas Carlsson. Lundin stated that it was "totally production driven" and "created from the kick and the bass up". Carlsson wrote the song's lyrics while he was taking a driver's test in Stockholm, Sweden. The song was intended to be recorded by English boy band 5ive, but they rejected it as they wanted to become a rap band. Carlsson recalled that one of the band members immediately called for security and left for the airport. The song's chorus was initially written as a rap, where 5ive feared that they would be competing against Eminem.

Prior to its official release, NSYNC performed "Bye Bye Bye" at the Radio Music Awards on October 28, 1999, at the LIFEbeat AIDS benefit concert in New York on December 1, 1999, and on The Rosie O'Donnell Show on Christmas Eve in 1999. The song was released on January 17, 2000, although it was not available as a commercial single in order to increase demand for NSYNC's 2000 studio album No Strings Attached. Jive Records feared that "Bye Bye Bye" was released too early vis-à-vis the album, which caused them to consider releasing a second single in order to sustain interest.

Composition
The song opens with a string crescendo that climbs before Justin Timberlake's nasal falsetto ad-libs the phrase, "Hey, hey", which leads to the five-part harmony of the song's title. Instrumentation consisted of "buzzy electronics" adding texture to the band's vocals in contrast to the doo-wop of the Backstreet Boys, as well as hard drums, with a snare and kick drum. Lyrically, "Bye Bye Bye" describes a man's desires to end a romantic relationship with a difficult significant other. Carlsson initially wrote the song after his girlfriend left him for another man, whom she married and had children with. it is written in a key of A-flat major and composed in a tempo of 173 beats per minute per common time.

Critical reception
"Bye Bye Bye" was met with generally favorable reviews from music critics. Stephen Thomas Erlewine of AllMusic described the song as a "piledriving dance number with the catchiest chorus they've ever sang.” Robert Christgau commented that it featured "prefab rhythm at its most efficient." In 2015, Billboards Jason Lipshutz ranked it third on the list "Top 20 Essential Boy Band Songs," describing the song as "an absolute monster of a lead single." Additionally writing for the same magazine in 2018, Billboard staff placed "Bye Bye Bye" at number 12 on "The 100 Greatest Boy Band Songs of All Time", stating that it was one of "the most decisive breakup anthems in pop history" that contained "an iconic dance move to match". Rolling Stone staff ranked it as the sixth-greatest boy band song of all time, writing, "it remains their defining track, a four-minute blast of big hooks, tight harmonies and intriguingly meta subtext." However, another editor from the same magazine listed it as the 17th most annoying song of all time in 2007. In 2013, Complexs Kathy Iandoli ranked it as the best boy band song ever.

The song won "Best Pop Video,” "Best Choreography in a Video,” and "Viewer's Choice" at the 2000 MTV Video Music Awards, the most awarded to a single video that year. It also won a Radio Music Radio award in 2000 for best song of the year. The song was nominated for "Record of the Year" and "Best Pop Performance by a Duo or Group with Vocal" at the 2001 Grammy Awards. Other awards included 3 Teen Choice Awards in 2000 (Choice Single, Choice Music Video, and Song of the Summer), MuchMusic Video Music Award (Favorite International Group for "Bye Bye Bye") and Blockbuster Entertainment Award 2001 (category Favorite Single for "Bye Bye Bye").

Chart performance
"Bye Bye Bye" debuted on the Billboard Hot 100 at number 42, the week of January 29, 2000, reaching the top 10 by the week of March 4. The song remained in the top 10 through May 20, 2000, for 12 weeks. The single peaked at number four in April 2000 for two consecutive weeks. On the Mainstream Top 40 chart the song reached number one on March 4, 2000, and stayed at the top of the chart for ten weeks,  making it one of the songs with most weeks at number one on that chart. The song topped of the charts in Australia and New Zealand, and at number 3 in the United Kingdom. On the week of March 24, 2014, the song re-entered the New Zealand Singles Chart at number 14.

Music video

Background

The video was directed by Wayne Isham, and was released on January 11, 2000. The budget was estimated to be $1 million, which was attributed to the band wanting to be noticed on MTV. The song's dance routine was  choreographed by Darrin Henson, who received a phone call from NSYNC's manager Johnny Wright, as he was about to quit the music industry after missing out on a MTV Video Music Award for Jordan Knight's "Give It to You". Henson flew to Las Vegas, Nevada in 1999, where the band were performing at the Billboard Music Awards, so that he would be able to listen to the track. The band rehearsed at the Alley Kat Studio in Los Angeles over a few days, where Henson stated in a 2020 interview with Entertainment Weekly that he implemented moves that cannot be replicated by other groups such as the "black power fist", which he defined as "stop talking s—" when used in the song's title lyric. Henson won an MTV Video Music Award for Best Choreography at the 2000 MTV Video Music Awards, while NSYNC also won Best Pop Video at the same ceremony.

They contacted Isham through the phone, before he met them during dance rehearsals for the song. The band were fastened to bungee cords during the music video's shoot to mimick puppets on strings. Choreography was performed in a blue gimbal room, which Isham pointed out was inspired both by Fred Astaire in Royal Wedding and Lionel Richie's "Dancing on the Ceiling" music video (directed and choreographed by Stanley Donen). During the speeding train sequence, Chris Kirkpatrick and Joey Fatone performed their own stunts as they jumped from one train carriage to another, as a Steadicam operator needed to be replaced mid-scene, due to being uncomfortable with the risk. JC Chasez and Lance Bass were placed in a red Dodge Viper RT/10 as part of a car chase scene inspired by Chasez's favorite film, Ronin (1998); stunt coordinators who worked on the film were hired to assist with the music video shoot. The scene where Bass and Chasez drop into the car was filmed with an 18-wheeler carrying a pole, which allowed the two to drop into the car. Both scenes were shot in Fillmore, California as the train scenes were filmed on the Fillmore and Western Railway, a heritage railway that ceased operations in 2021.  Additional filming of the car-chase scenes was done on Piru Canyon Road, the route to Lake Piru - which is visible in the background during the car chase. 

On the January 24, 2000 episode of Making the Video, Timberlake explained his reaction to shooting his scene in the music video, stating that he had the easiest time with the stunts in comparison with the other band members, but wanted to "look good" while running instead of appearing like a "dork".

Synopsis

The video starts with the puppet master, Kim Smith, manipulating the NSYNC members as they are tied to strings. She cuts Chris and Joey loose first, as they run atop a speeding train and hide among the passengers to elude her. She cuts Justin loose next, as he outruns her trained dogs inside a warehouse and escapes into the pouring rain. JC and Lance are finally cut loose, as they fall into a red Dodge Viper RT/10. When the music pauses, JC cleans the disc and reinserts it before continuing. They flee from her, as she pursues them in a silver BMW Z3. They eventually make a sudden u-turn when a truck blocks them, forcing the puppet master to brake more slowly and spend more time performing a u-turn, allowing the two to flee in the opposite direction.

All the scenes are interspersed with shots of the band dancing in a rotating blue gimbal with a fixed camera, creating the illusion that they are on different gravity planes. The video edit of the song also briefly pauses the music when Justin lands in the warehouse, when JC and Lance land into the car to insert a CD, and the u-turn near the video's end. The final chorus is also extended twice; the first showcases the band inside the box, while the second highlights JC and Lance fleeing from the puppet master.

Reception
The music video peaked at number one on the TRL countdown for 25 consecutive days. The video was ranked at number 60 on MuchMusic's 100 Best Videos. In 2018, iHeartRadio's Nicole Mastrogiannis ranked Timberlake's appearance in the video as first on the Iconic Music Moments From the 00s list. The same year Billboard critics ranked it 21st among the "greatest music videos of the 21st century."

As of August 2021, the music video has over 268 million views on YouTube.

In other media
"Bye Bye Bye" is featured in the 2003 film X2 and the 2021 film Red Rocket as well as being the latter's trailer.

Awards and nominations

Track listing

CD single
 "Bye Bye Bye" – 3:19
 "Bye Bye Bye" (Instrumental) – 3:19
 "Could It Be You" – 3:41

Remixes
"Bye Bye Bye" (Teddy Riley's Funk Remix) – 4:50
"Bye Bye Bye" (Teddy Riley's Club Remix) – 5:28
"Bye Bye Bye" (Riprock 'n' Alex G. Club Remix) – 6:32 	
"Bye Bye Bye" (Riprock 'n' Alex G. Club Remix Radio Edit) – 4:53 	
"Bye Bye Bye" (Sal Dano's Peak Hour Dub) – 8:30

Credits and personnel
Credits adapted from the back cover of "Bye Bye Bye".

Recording
 Recorded at Battery Studios, NYC; Cove City Sound Studios, Orlando, FL; and Cheiron Studios, Stockholm, Sweden.

Personnel
 Kristian Lundin songwriter, producer
 Jake Schulze songwriter, producer
 Andreas Carlsson songwriter
 Michael Tucker recording engineer/Roland TR-909
 Bray Merritt assistant engineer
 Casey LaPoint harp
 Esbjörn Öhrwall guitar
 Tom Coyne mastering

Charts

Weekly charts

Year-end charts

Decade-end charts

Certifications

Release history

References

1999 songs
2000 singles
NSYNC songs
Jive Records singles
Music videos directed by Wayne Isham
Music videos featuring puppetry
Number-one singles in Australia
Number-one singles in New Zealand
Songs written by Andreas Carlsson
Songs written by Kristian Lundin
Songs written by Jake Schulze
RPM Top Singles number-one singles
Songs about parting